Barr & Stroud Limited was a pioneering Glasgow optical engineering firm. They played a leading role in the development of modern optics, including rangefinders, for the Royal Navy and for other branches of British Armed Forces during the 20th century. There was a non-military arm of the company which made medical equipment, like photocoagulators and electronic filters, some of which were used by the BBC. The company and its intellectual property passed through Pilkington group to Thales Optronics. The Barr and Stroud name was sold on to an importer of optical equipment, who use the trademarked name for a line of binoculars and similar instruments.

History

Archibald Barr and William Stroud had been associated from as early as 1888 when the two men were professors of, respectively, engineering and physics at the Yorkshire College (now the University of Leeds).  In 1891, they were approached by the Admiralty to submit a design for a short-base rangefinder for trial.  By this time, Barr had returned to Scotland and taken the post of Regius Professor of Civil Engineering and Mechanics at the University of Glasgow. Although apart, Barr and Stroud kept in close touch and in 1892 they were awarded with a contract for six of their rangefinders.

In 1895, Barr & Stroud's Patents Ltd was renting workshop space near the university, at 250 Byres Road, Glasgow, but demand for the product soon necessitated a move to larger premises in Ashton Lane, Glasgow.  By 1904, 100 men were working for the company in a new purpose-built factory in Anniesland, Glasgow designed by Campbell Douglas.  Shortly thereafter, in 1909, Stroud resigned his chair at the University of Leeds and moved to Glasgow to work for the company full-time.  Barr, in spite of a distinguished teaching career at Glasgow University, followed his example in 1913.  Together they formed Barr & Stroud Ltd. that year.

In 1914, they began extensions to the Anniesland works in order to meet the sharp increase in demand for their rangefinders that followed on the outbreak of the First World War. The war years saw the development of other products, including a torpedo depth recorder, a periscope rangefinder, fire-control systems and a dome sight for aircraft. During World War I there was a problem with the supply of binoculars to the armed forces and apart from the British makers, binoculars were bought in from various sources. So it was only natural that the military would be looking to rectify this problem. At the time Zeiss was probably the leading makers and the military thought this may cause a problem in the future.

It was c.1919 when the company started producing their first binoculars which were supplied to the British Navy and from then on the company continued to operate independently until c.1977 when they were taken over by the  Pilkington Group.  In 1992 operations moved from the original factory in Anniesland to a new plant in Linthouse on the site of the former Alexander Stephen and Sons shipyard.  In 2000 the company became a subsidiary of the French company, Thales Group, and in 2001 Barr & Stroud Ltd became Thales Optronics Ltd.

The Barr and Stroud brand name was then bought by Eastleigh-based Optical Distribution Services Ltd, who re-registered as Barr and Stroud Ltd in 2008. The new company has developed a new range of binoculars and telescopes. 
The new range of Barr & Stroud binoculars are currently made in China (Nov. 2011) and distributed by Optical Vision Ltd.

Engines 
In the 1920s Barr & Stroud Ltd started offering sleeve valve motorcycle engines based on a design by Peter Burt and L.J. McCollum. In a half-page advert in Motor Cycle magazine in 1922 they encouraged readers to contact them at Anniesland, Glasgow, for more information, or contact the manufacturers currently offering their 350cc single cylinder engine, naming Beardmore-Precision, Royal Scot, Edmund and Diamond motorcycles. In 1923 a new motorcycle manufacturer, Grindlay-Peerless offered a 999cc V-twin Barr & Stroud engined motorcycle, later adding a 500cc and 350cc single. They also offered J.A.P. engines, and it appears the racing success of the J.A.P. engines made them the preferred choice, and so the sleeve valve engines were dropped in 1927.

Computers 
Barr and Stroud constructed the first computer to be built in Scotland, the pioneering SOLIDAC minicomputer for the University of Glasgow, assembled between 1958 and 1963 as an attempt to expand into electronics.

Notes

External links

 Short History of Barr and Stroud 
 Post WW1 trials of Barr & Stroud rangefinders
 Current website
 Details of their WW1 era rangefinders
 Details of their WW1 era fire control instruments

Naval artillery
Anti-aircraft weapons
Military computers
Royal Navy
Firearm sights
Armoured fighting vehicle vision and sighting equipment
Manufacturing companies based in Glasgow
Engineering companies of the United Kingdom
Optics manufacturing companies

fi:Stereoetäisyysmittari